ENR may refer to:

In media:
 Engineering News-Record, a weekly magazine covering the global construction industry
Emissora Nacional de Radiodifusão, now Rádio e Televisão de Portugal, the Portuguese public service broadcasting corporation

In organizations:
European New Right, a European political far-right movement
Energizer Holdings, an American manufacturer that has NYSE code ENR
Bureau of Energy Resources, in the U.S. Department of State

In transportation:
 Egyptian National Railways, the national railway in Egypt
 Esquimalt and Nanaimo Railway
 East Norfolk Railway, a former railway in the United Kingdom, now site of the heritage Bure Valley Railway
 Ennore railway station (station code), a railway station in Chennai, Tamil Nadu, India

Other:
 Enoyl-acyl carrier protein reductase, an enzyme which catalyzes an essential step in fatty acid biosynthesis
 Esercito Nazionale Repubblicano (National Republican Army), the army of the Italian Social Republic from 1943 to 1945
 Ending Net Receivable, a financial term used by certain credit card companies
 Excess Noise Ratio, in radio frequency electronics a normalized measure of how much the noise power is above the thermal noise floor